Whitelaw is a hamlet in northern Alberta, Canada within the Municipal District of Fairview No. 136.

Demographics 

See also 
List of communities in Alberta
List of designated places in Alberta
List of hamlets in Alberta

References 

Municipal District of Fairview No. 136
Hamlets in Alberta
Designated places in Alberta